The NamibRand Nature Reserve is a private nature reserve in Southwestern Namibia in the Namib Desert. It is financially self-sustaining mainly through low impact tourism fees.

In 2012, the International Dark-Sky Association designated this as an International Dark-Sky Reserve.

References

External links
 

Nature reserves in Namibia
International Dark Sky Reserves